Miguel Valle Riestra (May 7, 1820–September 5, 1913) was a Peruvian military man.

People from Lima
1820 births
1913 deaths
Peruvian soldiers
Peruvian military personnel of the War of the Pacific